Brake bei Bielefeld is a railway station located in Brake, a part of Bielefeld, Germany. The station is located on the Hamm–Minden railway line. The train services are operated by Eurobahn and WestfalenBahn.

Train services
The following services currently call at Brake bei Bielefeld:

Notes

Railway stations in North Rhine-Westphalia
Buildings and structures in Bielefeld